= NGC 2960 =

Galaxy in the constellation Hydra

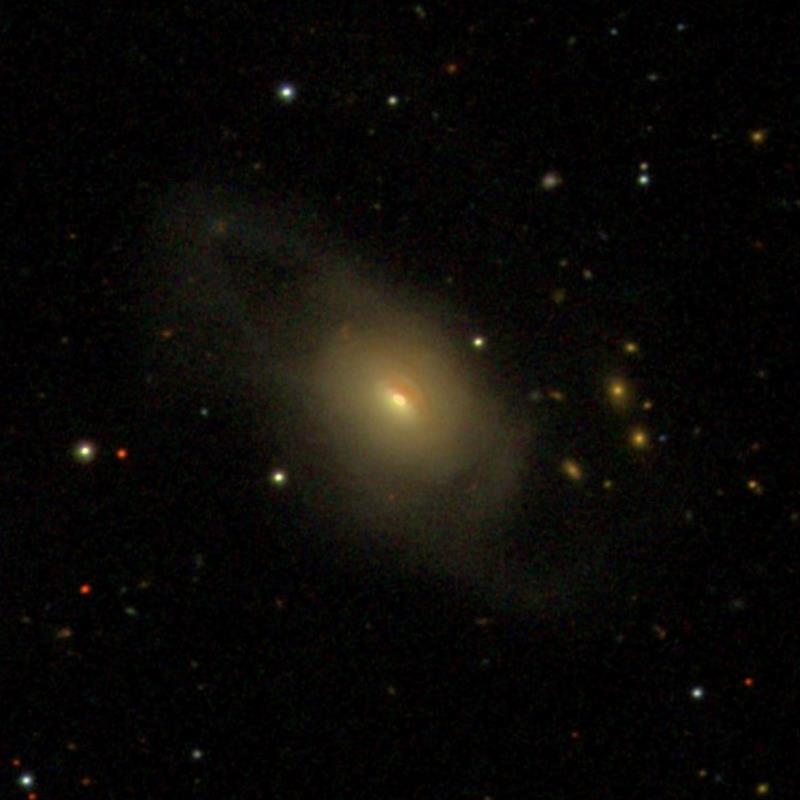

Observation data
- Constellation: Hydra
- Right ascension: 09^{h} 41^{m} 57^{s}
- Declination: +03° 27′ 29″

NGC 2960 is a spiral galaxy in the constellation Hydra. It was discovered on March 4, 1826, by the astronomer John Herschel.

According to a 2008 study of 76 galaxies by Alister Graham, the central bulge of NGC 2960 encloses a supermassive black hole whose mass is estimated at 1.2+0.3
−0.3 × 10^{7} M_{☉}.
